The following article contains a year-by-year list and statistics of football topscorers in the Primera División de Paraguay (Paraguayan First Division).

Topscorers by year
The following list only comprises the professional era and is missing data from 1906 to 1934 (amateur era).

Also, since 2008 the Paraguayan football association (APF) awards two national champions per year; one for the Torneo Apertura and another for the Torneo Clausura. Therefore, the following legends are used from 2008 and on:
 [A] = Apertura
 [C] = Clausura
 [O] = Overall topscorer for that year

Topscorers by club
The number of topscorers included in the following table only represent the overall topscorers for the entire year (those labeled with a [O] since 2008). Topscorers for specific tournaments (like Apertura [A] and Clausura [C]) are not included.

Records and statistics
Juan Samudio is the all-time goalscoring leader with 111 goals, all of them scored for Libertad and Guaraní from 1997 to the present day. Mauro Caballero is second on the list with 107 goals between 1992 and 2007, playing for Olimpia, Cerro Porteño, Nacional and Libertad.
Flaminio Silva is the player to have scored more goals in a single season: 34 goals in 1936, playing for Olimpia.
Máximo Rolón is the player with the most consecutive goalscoring titles (3 times): he was the topscorer in  1954, 1955 and 1956; playing for Libertad.
Héctor Núñez is the only foreign player to win the goalscoring title back-to-back (1994–1995), playing for Cerro Porteño.

See also
Primera División de Paraguay
Paraguayan football league system

References

External links
Asociacion Paraguaya de Futbol
Teledeportes Digital

Topscorers
Association football player non-biographical articles